RAF Gibraltar (also formerly known as North Front) is a Royal Air Force station on Gibraltar. No military aircraft are currently stationed there, but RAF, Commonwealth and aircraft of other NATO nations will periodically arrive for transient stopovers, exercises, or other temporary duty. Administered by British Forces Gibraltar, the station is a joint civil-military facility that also functions as the Rock's civilian airport – Gibraltar Airport, with the civilian airport's passenger terminal building and apron facilities located on the north side of the runway while the apron and hangar of RAF Gibraltar are located on the south side of the runway.

History

Early history

A Royal Naval Air Service seaplane base was opened at Gibraltar during the First World War.

The airport was constructed during World War II when Gibraltar was an important naval base for the British. Originally opened in 1939, it was only an emergency airfield for the Royal Navy's Fleet Air Arm. However, the runway was later extended by reclaiming some land from the Bay of Gibraltar using rock blasted from the Rock of Gibraltar while carrying out works on military tunnels. This last major extension of the runway allowed larger aircraft to land at Gibraltar. At this time the airfield completely obliterated the former Gibraltar horse racing track.

On 25 September 1939,  No. 200 (Coastal) Group RAF was formed as a subordinate formation to HQ RAF Mediterranean in control of No. 202 Squadron RAF. The Group's function was the control of Royal Air Force units operating from Gibraltar.  In late 1940 the Group was transferred to Coastal Command.  Later a joint RN/RAF Area Combined Headquarters was formed which commenced operations in early 1942.

RAF North Front opened in 1942 and RAF New Camp opened around the same time. RAF New Camp was built on reclaimed land in the harbour next to Montagu Bastion and was the site for a slipway and hangar for flying boats and RAF motor launches.

The airfield played a major part in Operation Torch, the Anglo-American invasion of French North Africa (French colonial possessions in Algeria, Tunisia and Morocco) in November 1942.

Following the major reorganization of the Allied air forces at the Casablanca Conference in January 1943, RAF Gibraltar became a major sub-command of the Mediterranean Air Command under Air Chief Marshal Sir Arthur Tedder in February 1943.

Anti-submarine warfare was a major priority of RAF Gibraltar during the later years of the Second World War and some of their aircraft were equipped with special detectors to locate German U-boats in the relatively shallow waters around Gibraltar. United States Navy Fleet Air Wing 15 based at Port Lyautey coordinated its antisubmarine warfare operations with RAF Gibraltar and assigned a ZP-14 Squadron blimp pilot/liaison officer to Gibraltar.

Post-war
On 29 May 1945 the Area Combined Headquarters was shut down and most of the personnel sent home. Weather flights from Gibraltar were maintained at the end of the war by No. 520 Squadron RAF flying Halifaxes. This was superseded by a detachment of No. 518 Squadron RAF from Aldergrove, and then by the arrival of No. 224 Squadron RAF. Initially the squadron dispatched a detachment in May 1948, but the whole squadron moved to Gibraltar in August 1951. It was re-equipped with Avro Shackletons. The station officially became "RAF Gibraltar" in 1966.

The RAF camp, now known as Devil's Tower Camp, which was increasingly used by the British Army in the 1960s and 1970s, became the home of the Royal Gibraltar Regiment.

By the 1980s RAF Gibraltar was increasingly being used as a Forward Operating Base for middle east operations.

On 4 February 2011, the new RAF headquarters in Gibraltar was officially opened by The Chief of Joint Operations, Air Marshal Sir Stuart Peach.

In 2016 a major runway resurfacing project was completed ensuring both military and civilian flights could continue.

Units stationed

Commanding officers
Air Vice-Marshal Sturley Simpson – AOC, AHQ Gibraltar, December 1941 to Feb 1944
Air Vice Marshal William Elliot – AOC, RAF Gibraltar, Feb 1944 to June 1944
Air Vice Marshal Alick Stevens – AOC, RAF Gibraltar, June 1944 to August 1945

Gibraltar squadrons
No. 224 Squadron RAF (Disbanded)

Gallery

Panoramic view

See also

 List of Royal Air Force commands

References

Further reading

External links

 
 UK Military Aeronautical Information Publication – Gibraltar (LXGB)

British Forces Gibraltar
Royal Air Force stations in Europe
Royal Air Force stations of World War II in Europe
1942 establishments in Gibraltar